E86 may refer to:
 European route E86
 Noto-Satoyama Kaidō, partly numbered as E86, in Japan
 E86 cluster bomb
 King's Indian Defence, Sämisch Variation, Encyclopaedia of Chess Openings code

See also 
 BMW Z4